The 2015–16 season was the 49th season in the existence of AS Nancy Lorraine and the club's third consecutive season in the second division of French football. In addition to the domestic league, Nancy participated in this season's editions of the Coupe de France and Coupe de la Ligue.

Players

First-team squad
As of 2 February 2016.

Out on loan

Transfers

In

Out

Pre-season and friendlies

Competitions

Overview

Ligue 2

League table

Results summary

Results by round

Matches

Coupe de France

Coupe de la Ligue

Notes

References

AS Nancy Lorraine seasons
Nancy